Kongsbakken Upper Secondary School is an upper secondary school in Tromsø, Norway. Founded in 1833, the school is one of Northern-Norway's oldest learning institutions.<ref name="historie" The school consists of a main building, and a building for the school's music, dance and drama pupils - the MD-building.
In the year 2000, Kongsbakken videregående skole had approximately 650 pupils, with about as many boys as girls. The school administration consists of a headmaster, a deputy headmaster and five section leaders. Additionally, the school has janitors, councellors, office staff and a librarian. Approximately 80 teachers provide education at Kongsbakken.

The school offers the following educational programmes, which allow for higher education at a university or university college: realfag (Exact sciences), linguistic subjects and social science/economy, and music, dance and drama.

Since 1930, the students of the schools have made the annual Bragerevyen in their Christmas brakes, a revue premièring on 1 January.

History

The institution dates back to 1833 when Tromsø Middel- og Realskole opened, with two teachers and eighteen male students aged 12 to 16. At the time, the premises were three classrooms in a house that stood where Frederik Langes gate 14 is today. The two year educational programme comprised the subjects writing, mathematics, Norwegian, history, geography, religion, Latin, Greek, German and English (optional). The first headmaster was Frederik Lange.

The Norwegian system of education has evolved continually since the 1830s, hence the school has been known under the following names:

 1833–1858: Tromsø Middel- og Realskole
 1858–1870: Tromsö lærde og Realskole
 1870–1965: Tromsø offentlige høiere almenskole
 1965–1976: Tromsø Gymnas
 1976–present: Kongsbakken videregående skole

Notable alumni
Håkon Gebhardt
Anne Holt
Espen Lind
Dagny (singer)

References

External links

Secondary schools in Norway
Buildings and structures in Tromsø
Education and research in Tromsø
Educational institutions established in 1833
Troms County Municipality
1833 establishments in Norway